Teysin, Teisin is a village and a railway station on Komsomolsk–Dezhnyovka railway line in Elban urban-type settlement, Amursky District, Khabarovsk Krai, situated close to Lake Bolon. 
Army unit 55487 (GRAU), where an explosion killed one person and injured seven.

References

Rural localities in Khabarovsk Krai